Krišs Kārkliņš (born 31 January 1996) is a Latvian footballer who plays as a defender or midfielder for Valmiera and the Latvia national team.

Career
Kārkliņš made his international debut for Latvia on 6 September 2020 in the UEFA Nations League against Malta, which finished as a 1–1 draw.

Career statistics

International

References

External links
 
 
 
 National team statistics at LFF.lv

1996 births
Living people
Footballers from Riga
Latvian footballers
Latvia youth international footballers
Latvia under-21 international footballers
Latvia international footballers
Association football defenders
Association football midfielders
FK Liepājas Metalurgs players
FK Liepāja players
Riga FC players
Valmieras FK players
Latvian Higher League players